This is a list of programs broadcast by Echourouk TV.

Programs

Events 
Notable events to which Echorouk TV hold broadcasting rights include:

Football 
 Belgian First Division A

Television dramas 
 Algerian television dramas
 B73
 Lala Zineb

 Arab television dramas
 The Exit

 Turkish television dramas
 Muhteşem Yüzyıl: Kösem (2017–17)
 Ötesiz İnsanlar (2016–17)

Children's series

Animated series 
 Qiṣṣat Āyah (Lebanon)
 Loulou & Boulboul

Anime

See also 
 Echorouk TV

References 

Lists of television series by network